Zachary Adam Gordon (born February 15, 1998) is an American actor. He rose to prominence by playing Greg Heffley in the first three films of the Diary of a Wimpy Kid film series. He then went on to play Tate Wilson in Good Trouble and Jason Cohen in Dead of Summer.

Early life
Gordon was born in Oak Park, California, to Linda and Kenneth Gordon. He has two older brothers and was raised in Southern California. He graduated from a public high school in Oak Park. He is Jewish.

Career
Gordon has made multiple television appearances on programs such as How I Met Your Mother and All of Us. He also appeared in the 2008 pilot of Desperate Housewives, plus two other episodes, and in two episodes of 24 that aired in January 2009. He appeared in three episodes as a guest star on Last Man Standing, where he played Tim's daughter's boyfriend.

His film credits include Sex and Death 101, Lower Learning, the Garry Marshall film Georgia Rule (for which he won the Young Artist Award for his portrayal of Ethan), The Brothers Bloom, as young Bloom, and in National Treasure: Book of Secrets.

Gordon has been credited with numerous voice over roles including Brad Spolyt in The Chubbchubbs Save Xmas, Ricky Garcia in Project Gilroy, San San in Nick Jr.'s Ni Hao, Kai-Lan and The Mighty B! He was a series regular as the original voice of Gil in the Nickelodeon series Bubble Guppies.

Gordon had voice cameo roles as Baby Melman in the animated film Madagascar: Escape 2 Africa, Kotaro in Afro Samurai: Resurrection, and young Tony Stark in The Super Hero Squad Show. In 2010, he played Greg Heffley in the film Diary of a Wimpy Kid. In 2011, he voiced Papi Jr. in Beverly Hills Chihuahua 2 and as Paws in Disney's The Search for Santa Paws.

In June 2010, 20th Century Fox announced a sequel to Diary of a Wimpy Kid; Gordon returned as Greg Heffley and the film, Diary of a Wimpy Kid: Rodrick Rules, was released on March 25, 2011.

In 2011, Gordon provided voices for Charlie Brown, Linus, and Franklin on the comedy show Robot Chicken, and in 2012, he reprised the role of Greg Heffley in Diary of a Wimpy Kid: Dog Days. In the fourth film, Diary of a Wimpy Kid: The Long Haul, he was replaced by Jason Drucker. In October 2013, Gordon was chosen to host a miniseries for Nintendo, titled Skylander's Boomcast, on YouTube channel SkylandersGame, reviewing and talking about the video game series Skylanders.

Additional films for 2013 included The Incredible Burt Wonderstone and a role as Pete Kidder in Walden Media's and Hallmark Channel's Pete's Christmas.

Filmography

Film

Television

Video games

Awards and nominations

Discography

Singles

References

External links
 
 Interview with Gordon on Channel One News

1998 births
Living people
21st-century American male actors
American male child actors
American male film actors
American male television actors
American male video game actors
American male voice actors
Jewish American male actors
Male actors from California
People from Oak Park, California
21st-century American Jews